Don't Get Mad, Get Even is the fifth studio album by British hard rock/heavy metal band Samson, released in 1984. Don't Get Mad, Get Even was included in the three-disc compilation The Polydor Years, issued by Caroline International in 2017, which also includes the album Before the Storm and a third CD with various B-sides, live and studio rarities. This compilation was the only official transfer of the original record to CD. An unofficial bootleg was made and sold in New Zealand, released in 1997 on CD.

Reception
Reviews have been generally positive of the album since its release. Götz Kühnemund of the German magazine Rock Hard praised it, highly recommending it to metal fans and going on to say that it "grows with every listen and even becomes SAMSON's best album!" They compared the LP to being roughly on the same hardness level as Def Leppard's Pyromania album and that it will, therefore "not appeal to every headbanger. But every SAMSON fan won't be able to get it off the turntable after listening to it for the first time!"

Track listing
Original vinyl release

Notes
Originally released in 1984. Unofficially transferred to CD in 1997.
Tracks 11 & 12 from the 12" Single Are You Ready.
Tracks 13 & 14 from the 12" Single The Fight Goes On.
Tracks 15 & 16 from the 2 x 7" Single Life On The Run.

Production 
Samson
 Nicky Moore – vocals
 Paul Samson – guitar
 Chris Aylmer – bass guitar
 Pete Jupp – drums

Additional musicians
Martin Ditcham - percussion (additional)
Stevie Lange - backing vocals	
Joy Yates - backing vocals

Production
Pip Williams - producer
Alwyn Clayden - art direction
Green Ink - artwork, design
Ian Cooper - mastering
Louis Austin - engineering
Gregg Jackman - engineering

References

External links

1984 albums
Samson (band) albums